Zhou Xiaozhou (born October 1956) is a lieutenant general (zhongjiang) of the People's Liberation Army (PLA). He was a delegate to the 11th and 12th National People's Congress.

Biography
Zhou was born in Chao County (now Chaohu), Anhui, in October 1956. He enlisted in the People's Liberation Army (PLA) in 1973, and joined the Chinese Communist Party (CCP) in 1976. He graduated from the PLA National Defence University. In 2007, he was appointed commander of the 14th Group Army, he remained in that position until July 2012, when he was transferred to the Chengdu Military Region and appointed chief of staff. In December 2014, he became deputy commander of the Chengdu Military Region, and was appointed director of the Rehabilitation Office in January 2016.

Personal life 
His father Zhou Yibing (1922–2017) was a lieutenant general (zhongjiang) of the People's Liberation Army (PLA) who served as commander of the Beijing Military Region between 1987 and 1990.

References

1956 births
Living people
People from Chaohu
PLA National Defence University alumni
People's Liberation Army generals from Anhui
People's Republic of China politicians from Anhui
Chinese Communist Party politicians from Anhui
Delegates to the 11th National People's Congress
Delegates to the 12th National People's Congress